Theiner is a German surname. Notable people with the surname include:

Augustin Theiner (1804–1874), German theologian and historian
Wojciech Theiner (born 1986), Polish high jumper

See also
Theiler

German-language surnames